Trichaeta orientalis is a moth in the subfamily Arctiinae. It was described by József Gyula Hubertus Szent-Ivány in 1942. It is found in Tanzania.

References

Moths described in 1942
Arctiinae